Giancarlo Genta (born 1948 in Turin, Italy) is Professor of Machine Design and Construction at the Polytechnic University of Turin.  His areas of professional interest include vibration, vehicle design, magnetic bearings, and rotordynamics.  He has written or co-authored more than 50 articles in professional publications.  He has published extensively in the field of SETI research.

Since 2018 he is the chair of the automotive evolution class at Politecnico di Torino.

Selected publications
 Genta, G., Introduction to the Mechanics of Space Robots, Springer, 2012,  [received Engineering Science Award from International Academy of Astronautics in 2014]
 G. Genta, M. Rycroft,  Will space actually be the final frontier of humankind?, Acta Astronautica, Vol. 58, 2006, pp. 287–295.

 G. Genta,  On a Persisting Misunderstanding on the Role of Hysteretic Damping in Rotordynamics, Journal of Vibration and Acoustics, Vol. 126, July 2004, 469-471.
 G. Genta, N. Amati,  Mobility on Planetary Surfaces: May Walking Machines be a Viable Alternative?, Planetary and Space Science, 52, 2004, pp. 31–40.
 Genta, G. (1997). Motor Vehicle Dynamics: Modeling and Simulation. World Scientific.  
 G. Genta, Kinetic Energy Storage, Butterworths, London, 1985

External links
Biographic Website 

1948 births
Living people
Engineers from Turin
Academic staff of the Polytechnic University of Turin